Mys is a rural locality (a village) in Vasilyevskoye Rural Settlement, Vashkinsky District, Vologda Oblast, Russia. The population was 11 as of 2002.

Geography 
The distance to Lipin Bor is 23 km, to Vasilyevskaya is 20 km. Pinshino is the nearest rural locality.

References 

Rural localities in Vashkinsky District